The 2020–21 season was the 114th season in the existence of Atlético Madrid and the club's 19th consecutive season in the top flight of Spanish football. In addition to the domestic league, Atlético Madrid participated in this season's editions of the UEFA Champions League and also participated in the Copa del Rey. The season covered the period from 14 August 2020 to 30 June 2021, with the late start to the season due to the COVID-19 pandemic in Spain.

Kits

Players
Stats as of the end of the 2019–20 season.

Transfers

In

 Total Spending: €88M

Out

 Total Income: €80M

Net Income:  €8M

Pre-season and friendlies

Competitions

Overall record

La Liga

League table

Results summary

Results by round

Matches
The league fixtures were announced on 31 August 2020.

Copa del Rey

UEFA Champions League

Group stage

The group stage draw was held on 1 October 2020.

Knockout phase

Round of 16
The draw for the round of 16 was held on 14 December 2020.

Statistics

Squad statistics

1Player from reserve team (Atlético Madrid B).2Player left the club during the season.

Goalscorers

1Player from reserve team (Atlético Madrid B).
2Player left the club during the season.

Clean sheets

1Player from reserve team (Atlético Madrid B).

Attendances

Notes

References

External links

Atlético Madrid seasons
Atlético Madrid
Atlético Madrid
Spanish football championship-winning seasons